Kilmore (Gaelic: A' Chille Mhór) is a small hamlet, on the east coast of the Sleat peninsula of the Isle of Skye is in the Scottish council area of Highland.

Sleat Parish Church (1876) is located here, with the ruins of the Old Parish Church behind (1631–1876). A former Minister Rev. John Forbes (1818–63) was a noted Gaelic scholar who wrote a Gaelic grammar and investigated the deaths of three girls from the parish who were taken to the cotton mills of Manchester as forced-labour and published his findings in a book Weeping in the Isles (1853).

References

External links

Populated places in the Isle of Skye